Uíge/Carmona Airport  is a public use airport on the west side of Uíge, the capital of Uíge Province in Angola.

The runway additionally has a  displaced threshold on each end.

The Uíge non-directional beacon (Ident: UG) is located 2.2 nautical miles south of the runway.

Airlines and destinations

See also
 List of airports in Angola
 Transport in Angola

References

External links
 
 OurAirports - Uíge
 OpenStreetMap - Uíge

Airports in Angola
Uíge Province